The Spectre is the name given to several fictional antiheroes who have appeared in numerous comic books published by DC Comics. The character first appeared in More Fun Comics #52 (February 1940). He was created by Jerry Siegel and Bernard Baily, although several sources attribute creator credit solely to Siegel, limiting Baily to being merely the artist assigned to the feature.

Publication history

Golden Age version

The Spectre debuted in More Fun Comics #52 (February 1940) when hard-boiled cop Jim Corrigan, on his way with his fiancée Clarice to their engagement party, is murdered by thugs who stuff him into a barrel filled with cement and then throw it into a body of water. His spirit is refused entering into the afterlife, however, and he is sent back to Earth by an entity referred to only as "the Voice" to eliminate evil.

The Spectre seeks bloody vengeance against Corrigan's murderers in grim, supernatural fashion. One of them was turned into a skeleton upon touching him. Corrigan soon creates his signature costume, breaks off his romance with Clarice, and continues to live as Jim Corrigan, assuming the secret identity of the Spectre whenever he is needed. He eventually turns down an offer to relinquish his mission to destroy all evil.

The Spectre is soon awarded charter membership in the first-ever superhero team, the Justice Society of America in All Star Comics. Jim Corrigan is resurrected in More Fun #75 (January 1942), after which the Spectre's ghostly form enters and emerges from Jim Corrigan, functioning independently of him. During the mid-1940s, the popularity of superhero comics began to decline and the Spectre was reduced to playing the role of guardian angel to a bumbling character called "Percival Popp, the Super Cop", who first appeared in More Fun #74 (December 1941). When Corrigan enlisted in the military and departed to serve in World War II, in More Fun #90 (April 1943), the Spectre became permanently invisible, becoming a secondary player in his own series. The feature's final installment was in issue #101 (February 1945) and the Spectre made his last appearance in the superhero group the Justice Society of America at roughly the same time in All Star Comics #23 (winter 1944–1945).

Silver Age version
In the mid-1950s and 1960s Silver Age of Comic Books, DC Comics editor Julius Schwartz revived the Spectre and returned him to the role of an avenging undead spirit, beginning in Showcase #60  (February 1966). Under writer Gardner Fox and penciller Murphy Anderson, his power was vastly increased and at times he approached omnipotence. A 1987 magazine retrospective on the character said this revival had been initially announced as a team-up with Doctor Mid-Nite. After a three-issue try-out in Showcase, the Spectre appeared in the superhero-team comic Justice League of America #46–47 in that year's team-up of the titular group and its 1940s predecessors, the Justice Society of America: written by Gardner Fox. A few months later, he co-starred with the Silver Age Flash in The Brave and the Bold #72 (July 1967).

The Spectre was given his own title, premiering in December 1967, while simultaneously making another appearance in The Brave and the Bold #75 (January 1968), this time teamed with Batman. In The Spectre, the creative credits varied widely over the 10 issues published, with introduction of a then-newcomer to comics, Neal Adams, who drew issues #2–5 and wrote issues #4–5. For its final two issues, the comic became in effect a horror anthology, with the title character being little more than a narrator in several short stories. The Spectre title suffered from the same problem that vexed the Golden Age series: writing meaningful stories using a character who was virtually omnipotent.

The end to this era came at the climax of another JLA/JSA crossover, when Doctor Fate frees the Ghostly Guardian from a crypt in time to block a collision between Earth-One and Earth-Two caused by an alien device planted in the Red Tornado II. The Spectre's body is torn apart when Doctor Fate creates a massive explosion to destroy the device and return the colliding Earths to their own dimensions.

Bronze Age version

In the 1970s, DC revived the Spectre again in the superhero anthology series Adventure Comics. Editor Joe Orlando explained that this was the Earth-One version of the Spectre, though some at DC said otherwise. Later stories explained that the Spectre had moved from Earth-Two and taken over the body of the Jim Corrigan of Earth-One. Beginning with the 12-page "The Wrath of ... the Spectre" in issue #431 (February 1974), writer Michael Fleisher and artist Jim Aparo produced 10 stories through issue #440 (July 1975) that became controversial for what was considered gruesome, albeit bloodless, violence. Comics historian Les Daniels commented that the Spectre had

In the series' letter column, some fans indicated uneasiness with this depiction. In issue #435 (October 1974), Fleisher introduced a character that shared their concerns, a reporter named Earl Crawford. The series was cancelled with three scripts written, but not yet drawn. Several years later, these remaining three chapters were penciled by Aparo, lettered and inked by others, and published in the final issue of Wrath of the Spectre, a four-issue miniseries in 1988 that reprinted the 10 original Fleisher-Aparo stories in its first three issues and three newly drawn stories in the fourth one. Fleisher had stated in 1980 that only two scripts were left undrawn.

The Spectre also made a guest appearance in the "Doctor Thirteen" feature in Ghosts #97–99 (February–April 1981) and would go on to periodic guest appearances in such other DC titles as The Brave and the Bold, DC Comics Presents and All-Star Squadron.

A new Spectre series was planned for 1986, with Steve Gerber as writer and Gene Colan as penciler. However, Gerber missed the deadline for the first issue so that he could watch the last day of shooting on the film Howard the Duck and DC cancelled the series in response.

Among the many changes made to DC Comics' characters during the latter half of the 1980s following the Crisis on Infinite Earths miniseries, the Spectre fought the Anti-Monitor largely depowered. Prior to this, the Spectre is revealed to be guarding an entrance to Hell in Swamp Thing (vol. 2) Annual #2 by writer Alan Moore and artists Stephen R. Bissette and John Totleben. Then, in the conclusion to Moore's "American Gothic" storyline in Swamp Thing (vol. 2) #35-50, the Spectre is defeated by the Great Evil Beast. Next, in the Last Days of the Justice Society of America special, the Spectre fails to resolve a situation and is punished by God for his failure.

In his fourth solo series and second self-titled comic, The Spectre, under writer Doug Moench, Corrigan became the central figure in this story of an occult-oriented private detective agency. The Spectre's powers were significantly reduced here, with even the act of emerging from Corrigan's physical body being painful to both. This run ended with issue #31 (November 1989). A few months after this, the Spectre had a cameo in writer Neil Gaiman's The Books of Magic, a four-issue miniseries starring many DC occult characters.

Modern Age version
Three years after the cancellation of the Doug Moench version, the Spectre was again given his own series, this time written by writer and former theology student John Ostrander, who chose to re-examine the Spectre in his aspects as both the embodied Avenging Wrath of the Murdered Dead and as a brutal 1930s policeman.

Ostrander placed the Spectre in complex, morally ambiguous situations that posed certain ethical questions, one example being: What vengeance should be wrought upon a woman who killed her abusive husband in his sleep? Other notable dilemmas included:

 The tiny (fictional) nation of Vlatava, the history of which was an endless cycle of civil war, ethnic cleansing, retribution, and blood feuds that had endured for centuries. The Spectre responded by judging the whole nation guilty, razing the land and killing the entire population except for two opposing politicians, one of them the on-again, off-again supervillain Count Vertigo.
 The pending execution of a wrongfully convicted man. His death sentence was commuted to life imprisonment after the Spectre threatened to kill the entire population of the state of New York in retribution, arguing that if the execution was carried out, the "people of the state of New York" would become guilty of murder in his eyes.
 A 90-year-old woman who had spent her entire life trying to atone for the single murder she had secretly committed in the 1920s. The Spectre found her on her deathbed.

Ostrander also added several new concepts into the Spectre's history: He revealed that the Spectre was meant to exist as the embodiment of the Wrath of God, and Jim Corrigan was but the latest human spirit assigned to guide him while he existed on Earth. It was also shown that the Spectre was a fallen angel named Aztar who had participated in Lucifer's rebellion, but then repented, and that serving as the embodiment of God's anger was its penance.

Furthermore, the Spectre was not the first embodiment of God's anger, but was the replacement for the previously minor DC character Eclipso. Ostrander chose to portray this as a distinction between the Spectre's pursuit of vengeance and Eclipso's pursuit of revenge. In a historical context, Eclipso was responsible for the biblical Flood, while the Spectre was the Angel of Death who slew the firstborn Egyptian children. The Spectre and Eclipso have battled numerous times through history, but neither entity can be fully destroyed.

The Spectre has also played a pivotal role in the Crisis on Infinite Earths and Zero Hour: Crisis in Time storylines. In both cases, in the final struggle against the main villain (the Anti-Monitor and Parallax, respectively), the Spectre is the only hero capable of standing against the villains directly, allowing the other heroes time to put a plan into action that would destroy the villains once and for all.

Although all of these versions are usually considered to be from the Earth-Two of the Pre-Crisis DC Multiverse (the same continuity started during the Golden Age), an Earth-One version of the Spectre was shown to team up with Batman and Superman on a few occasions.

Hal Jordan, Spirit of Redemption

Eventually, Corrigan's soul finds peace. He relinquishes the Spectre-Force and goes on to Heaven. The role of the Spectre is later assumed by Hal Jordan, the spirit of the former Green Lantern, during the Day of Judgment storyline written by Geoff Johns, when a fallen angel attempts to gain the Spectre's power. Corrigan is asked to come back, but refuses as he has found peace. The Spectre-Force chooses Jordan as his new host because Jordan seeks to atone for his universe-threatening actions as the villainous Parallax. His next appearance was in a four-part story arc in Legends of the DC Universe #33–36. In the series The Spectre (vol. 4), written by J. M. DeMatteis, Jordan bends the Spectre's mission from one of vengeance to one of redemption and makes appearances elsewhere in the DC Universe, such as advising Superman during the "Emperor Joker" storyline or helping Wally West keep his family safe by erasing public knowledge of his true identity.

In the 2001 Green Arrow storyline "Quiver" written by Kevin Smith and the final Supergirl story arc, "Many Happy Returns" by Peter David, revealed that the Spectre (Hal Jordan) is aware of the Crisis on Infinite Earths. He is one of the few DC Universe characters with this knowledge.

After The Spectre (vol. 4) was cancelled, Jordan was forced to return, temporarily, to the Spectre's mission of vengeance, following a confrontation between the new Justice Society of America and the Spirit King, who had managed to "resurrect" the ghosts of all those the Spectre had damned to Hell when Hal's attempt to turn the Spectre's mission to redemption weakened his hold on the damned until Hal 'accepted' his original mission of vengeance. In Green Lantern: Rebirth, written by Johns, the Spectre-Force's decision of choosing Jordan as his host was retconned into being not because of Jordan's worthiness, but as an effort to destroy the Parallax entity, which was infecting Jordan's soul. After the Spectre-Force was able to purge Parallax from Jordan, it departed to move on to the next recipient of the spirit.

Day of Vengeance

Without a human host, the Spectre-Force becomes unstable and goes on a vengeance-fueled rampage. Not only is it killing murderers, it also kills people for minor crimes, such as petty theft. Its lack of a human host deprives it of the ability to effectively judge the sins in their appropriate context. As detailed in the miniseries Day of Vengeance, Jean Loring is transformed into the new Eclipso. She goes after the Spectre and seduces him into removing all magic in the DC Universe. Eclipso explains to the Spectre that all things that follow the rules of the physical universe follow God's law. Anything that breaks those rules thus breaks God's law and is therefore evil. Consequently, as magic breaks the rules of the physical universe, it is an originating source of tremendous evil (this line of logic makes sense to the unstable Spectre-Force). The Spectre destroys magical constructs, institutions that teach magic and magical dimensions. In one such dimension, his acts include the mass murder of over 700 battle-hardened magicians. His actions cause havoc to other very powerful magic-based characters:

 The Phantom Stranger – The Spectre turns him into a mouse.
 Black Adam – He fights the Spectre when the spirit invades his kingdom of Kahndaq and causes plagues of destruction.
 Doctor Fate – He is imprisoned in a dimension inside his helmet.
 Madame Xanadu – Her eyes are destroyed (and made incapable of restoration through magic) by the Spectre to prevent her from reading her magical tarot cards.
 Raven – She can no longer properly control her powers.
 The wizard Shazam – Despite the intervention of his champion Captain Marvel, Shazam is killed by the Spectre.

The Spectre also destroys the magic-fueled kingdom of Atlantis (the home of Aquaman) during his rampage.

In Day of Vengeance: Infinite Crisis Special #1, the Spectre kills Nabu, the last of the Great Lords of the Ninth Age and the Presence's attention is finally drawn into action. The Spectre is once again forced into a human host, stopping his mad rampage. Nabu reveals before dying that originally he and the other Lords had been working towards forming the perfect host for the Spectre, but those plans are cut short.

The text of the story is unclear on who the Great Lords were. Nabu (introduced in 1942 as the powerful entity responsible for Kent Nelson becoming Doctor Fate) was one of the Lords of Order. The Spectre had apparently killed the others, along with their counterparts the Lords of Chaos, with the exception of Mordru and Amethyst (whom he battled on Gemworld). Amethyst is among those gathered by the Phantom Stranger to aid in rebuilding the Rock of Eternity, and survives into the Tenth Age.

Alexander Luthor also revealed that he was indirectly responsible for the Spectre's actions in Day of Vengeance. Under Alexander Luthor's orders, the Psycho-Pirate gave Eclipso's diamond to Jean Loring, making her manipulate the Spectre-Force so that magic could be undone and used as fuel for Luthor's Multiverse tower.

Crispus Allen

In Gotham Central #38, Crispus Allen is killed by a corrupt policeman coincidentally named Jim Corrigan (not the same Corrigan that was formerly associated with the Spectre). While Allen's body is in the morgue, the Spectre-Force is forced against its will to enter Crispus Allen, taking Allen as its new host.

Blackest Night
During the 2009–2010  Blackest Night storyline, Black Hand reveals that the Spectre must be moved out of the way in order for the universe to be at peace. For that, he uses the Black Lantern Pariah, who unleashes more black rings which latch themselves onto Crispus' body (who was killed by Eclipso), turning him into a Black Lantern and sealing the Spectre-Force inside its host. Changing into a giant version, the Black Lantern Spectre declares that it wants Hal Jordan back. The Phantom Stranger and Blue Devil work together in an attempt to distract the Black Lantern Spectre from seeking out Hal Jordan. The Phantom Stranger manages to temporarily free the real Spectre, only for the Black Lantern to repress it again and, discarding the Stranger and Blue Devil, leaves to carry out its intention to cast vengeance on Hal Jordan.

In Coast City, Hal Jordan encounters the Black Lantern Spectre. Using the real Spectre-Force's power to protect itself, it is rendered immune to the combination of emotional lights that usually destroy Black Lanterns. Knowing that the Spectre is afraid of Parallax, Jordan allows himself to be possessed by the fear entity once more in order to stop him. The powers of the Spectre also become of interest to the Red Lantern Corps leader Atrocitus, as he senses the Spectre's real nature despite being influenced by the black ring: an embodiment of rage and vengeance. Atrocitus desires to harness the spirit's power for his corps and his own vengeance against the Guardians of the Universe. Parallax tears into the Black Lantern's body, freeing the real Spectre-Force and destroying the facsimile. Atrocitus attempts to turn the Spectre into his own rage entity but fails, the Spectre telling him that "he is God's rage" and of the true rage entity and warning him not to trifle with it. Parallax then attempts to destroy the Spectre, who uses his own fear of the entity coupled with the love Carol Ferris feels for Hal, to separate Parallax from its host. The Spectre then confronts Nekron, the master of the Black Lanterns, but discovers that Nekron is without a soul and is thus immune to his powers. The Spectre is then removed from the battlefield by Nekron to parts unknown.

Brightest Day
In the Brightest Day storyline, the Spectre resurfaces, again with Crispus Allen as its host, in the hills of Montana on the trail of the Butcher, the Red Lantern entity. The Spectre confronts Atrocitus once again when the two locate the Butcher, who is about to possess a man whose daughter had been killed by a death row inmate. Despite the Spectre's attempts to stop it, the Butcher succeeds, killing the criminal. The Butcher then attempts to possess Atrocitus, revealing that Atrocitus had a wife and children who were killed in the Manhunters' attack. With the Spectre's help, Atrocitus wards off the Butcher and imprisons it within his power battery. The Spectre attempts to judge the man that the Butcher possessed, but Atrocitus argues that his method of judgment is flawed. The Spectre calls off his judgment and is unable to judge Atrocitus, discovering that his mission is a "holy" one, although he warns Atrocitus that this will not last forever.

"Rise of Eclipso"
The Spectre later appears during James Robinson's "Rise of Eclipso" storyline in Justice League of America. In the story, Eclipso captures the angel Zauriel and begins to torture him to draw the attention of the Spectre. The plan succeeds, with the Spectre traveling to the moon to rescue Zauriel, only to be ambushed by Jade and the members of the Justice League's reserve roster, all of whom had been brainwashed by Eclipso. Once the heroes wear the Spectre down, Eclipso confronts his old nemesis and seemingly kills him by cleaving the Spectre in two. Eclipso then absorbs the Spectre's immense powers, which he then uses to shatter the moon with a single blow from his sword before attempting to use them to fulfill his sinister agenda. Eclipso is defeated by the reserve Justice League.

The New 52
Jim Corrigan is a Gotham City Police Detective whose fiancé is kidnapped. He is guided by the Phantom Stranger on the instructions of the Voice. He leads Corrigan to the abandoned warehouse where his girlfriend is being kept, but this turns out to be a trap. Corrigan and his girlfriend are killed by the kidnappers and he is then transformed into the Spectre, who accuses the Phantom Stranger of betraying him. As the Spectre is about to attack the Phantom Stranger, the Voice intervenes and sends the Spectre off to inflict his wrath on those who are more deserving of it.

It is revealed that the Voice chose Corrigan to be "the mirror of his desire for justice" (though Corrigan believes in vengeance) and imbued him with divine powers. Corrigan returns to work as a police detective in Gotham City, but his rage causes him to practice vengeance rather than justice in his alter ego as the Spectre. The Phantom Stranger attacks Corrigan's police precinct, convinced that Corrigan was the one who kidnapped his family out of revenge.
 
After the two exchange blows physically and verbally, the Voice himself intervenes in the form of a Scottish Terrier (his sense of humor) and informs the Stranger of his mistake, setting him on the right path. The Voice also sets Corrigan straight on his duty, making him realize he is meant to exact justice, not vengeance.

Batman calls in Corrigan and Batwing to investigate Arkham Asylum, because he believes something supernatural is going on and was already busy trying to end a violent gang war in Gotham. Corrigan and Batwing investigate and discover a demonic Deacon Blackfire commanding an army of corrupted humans and demons in the sewers beneath the asylum.

Corrigan eventually joins Gotham's Detailed Case Task Force, a small precinct responsible for investigating supernatural events off the books.

Powers and abilities
The Spectre possesses near-limitless capabilities, such as reality warping, invulnerability, and absolute strength. Virtually anything he wishes to do by judging is possible. He has no discernible weakness other than needing a human host for fair guidance, as well as divine laws and the Spear of Destiny.

Enemies

Each of the hosts of the Spectre have their own enemies:

 The Anti-Monitor - An evil counterpart of the Monitor.
 Clayface - A shapeshifting supervillain.
 Darkseid - The ruler of Apokolips.
 Eclipso - An incarnation of the Wrath of God who turned evil.
 First of the Fallen - The personification and embodiment of evil and negativity in the universe who is the former conscience of God.
 Joker - The Clown Prince of Crime.
 Killer Croc - A criminal with a scaly condition.
 The Manhunters - A group of alien robots.
 Neron - A demon-lord from Hell.
 Oom the Mighty - A statue with super-strength and magical powers who came to life and arrived on Earth to commit murders only to run afoul of the Spectre. Oom the Mighty later became a member of the Monster Society of Evil.
 Poison Ivy - A plant-manipulating criminal.
 Scarecrow - A scarecrow-themed criminal who specializes in fear.
 Sinestro - An enemy of the Green Lantern Corps.
 Two-Face - A scarred district attorney with a split personality.
 Wotan - An evil sorcerer.

Other versions

Kingdom Come
In the four-issue Elseworlds miniseries Kingdom Come, the Spectre is Jim Corrigan, a once-human soul imbued with angelic powers by God. In a near-apocalyptic world, the Spectre takes a preacher named Norman McCay through the events of a possible future of the DC Universe. Here, the Spectre is to determine who is responsible for an impending apocalyptic event. However, here his "faculties are not what they once were", and he is said to need an outside perspective to properly judge the events that they witness. A conversation between McCay and Deadman reveals that, with the passing of time, Corrigan has become further and further removed from humanity, now only wearing his cloak to cover an otherwise nude body. He is reminded by McCay of his humanity to see things through the perspective of the man that he once was and decides that no one is to blame. Corrigan becomes a member of McCay's congregation and they become friends. In the epilogue set in a superhero-themed restaurant, he expresses irritation that the meal named after him, the "Spectre Platter", is a mix of spinach and cottage cheese.

Tangent Comics
In the Tangent Comics imprint, the Spectre is a man named Taylor Pike, a boy genius who one day bombarded himself with neutrino energy and gained the power to become intangible. Initially operating as a thief, he later joined the Secret Six.
 Modern DC alternate universes
 There is an alternate version of the Spectre on Earth-2 shown in JSA Annual #1 (2008) as well as an evil Spectre on Earth-3 shown in Countdown #31 (2008) of the Crime Society of America. Both versions look similar to the Golden Age version.

Collected editions

Jim Corrigan

Crispus Allen

In other media

Television
 The Spectre appears in the Smallville two-part episode "Absolute Justice" on a painting that depicts them as a member of the Justice Society of America.
 The Spectre appears in Batman: The Brave and the Bold, voiced by Mark Hamill. This version is a member of the Justice Society of America. In his most notable appearance "Chill of the Night!", he and the Phantom Stranger bet on whether Batman will kill Joe Chill if given the knowledge that the latter killed his parents.
 In 2011, Fox announced plans to develop a television series featuring the Spectre. However, there has been no further development.

Arrowverse
Variations of Jim Corrigan appear in series set in the Arrowverse. One version appears in the TV series Constantine, portrayed by Emmett Scanlan, while an alternate universe version appears in the crossover event "Crisis on Infinite Earths", portrayed by Stephen Lobo, with the latter passing the Spectre's power to Oliver Queen so he can save the multiverse from the Anti-Monitor.

Film
 The Jim Corrigan incarnation of the Spectre appears in DC Showcase: The Spectre, voiced by Gary Cole.
 The Spectre makes a non-speaking appearance in Teen Titans Go! To the Movies.
 The Spectre appears in DC Showcase: Constantine - The House of Mystery, voiced by Lou Diamond Phillips.

Video games
 The Spectre appears in DC Universe Online, voiced by Robert Kraft.
 The Spectre appears in Scribblenauts Unmasked: A DC Comics Adventure.
 The Spectre appears as a playable character in Lego DC Super-Villains, voiced by Corey Burton. He appears as part of the "Justice League Dark DLC Character Pack" DLC.

Miscellaneous
 The Spectre appeared in issue #37 of the Justice League Unlimited tie-in comic book series.
 The Spectre appears in the Suicide Squad: Hell to Pay tie-in digital comic.
 The Spectre appears in the Injustice: Gods Among Us prequel comic. Having usurped the Spectre's powers from Jim Corrigan and joined Superman's Regime, Mister Mxyzptlk disguises himself as the former and goes on a killing spree, killing Jason Blood, Detective Harvey Bullock, and Deadman before rescuing Superman and Wonder Woman from Trigon.

Reception and awards
The character won the 1961 Alley Award as the Hero/Heroine Most Worthy of Revival and the 1964 Alley Award for Strip Most Desired for Revival.

IGN ranked the Spectre as the 70th greatest superhero of all time.

References

Characters created by Jerry Siegel
Comics characters introduced in 1940
Comics by Gardner Fox
Comics by John Ostrander
DC Comics angels
DC Comics characters who are shapeshifters
DC Comics characters who can teleport 
DC Comics characters who use magic
DC Comics characters with superhuman strength
DC Comics deities
DC Comics fantasy characters
DC Comics male superheroes
DC Comics characters who have mental powers
DC Comics telekinetics 
DC Comics telepaths
DC Comics titles
Fictional characters who can change size
Fictional characters who can manipulate time
Fictional characters who can manipulate reality
Fictional characters who can turn intangible
Fictional characters with spirit possession or body swapping abilities
Fictional characters with immortality
Fictional characters with density control abilities
Fictional characters with elemental transmutation abilities
Fictional ghosts
Fictional mass murderers
Fictional personifications of death
Golden Age superheroes
Horror comics
Mythology in DC Comics
Merged fictional characters